Santa Clara Island (Spanish: Isla de Santa Clara; Basque: Santa Klara uhartea) is an island located in San Sebastian, Spain, in the middle of the bay of Donostia. It is located between the two most important mountains of the city, Urgull and Igueldo.

The island has a small beach which only appears with low tide. There is a small bar and a small port. Despite the small size of the island, the beach has a lifeguard service because of its popularity in the summer. The concrete pier of Santa Clara is served to Donostia by boat, running every 30 minutes. The island has an uninhabited lighthouse.

Wildlife and plants
The island supports a range of exotic species including:
Tamarix gallica (French tamarisk)
Chamaecyparis lawsoniana (Lawson's cypress )
Arundo donax (giant cane)
Populus nigra (black poplar)
Betula celtiberica (birch)
Ficus carica (common fig)
Robinia pseudoacacia (black locust tree)
Ligustrum ovalifolium (oval-leaved privet)
Euonymus japonicus (Japanese spindle)
Geranium robertianum (herb Robert)
Pteridium aquilinum (common bracken)
Trifolium reptans (clover)
Crithmum maritimum (rock samphire)

Animals include the Iberian wall lizard (Podarcis hispanicus sebastiani) as well as gulls, the European shag (Phalacrocorax aristotelis)  and the common guillemot (Uria aalge) .

History
At the end of the 16th century, the people of Donostia (San Sebastián) who were infected by the plague were transferred to the island to prevent the spread of infection. The island of Santa Clara is state property, transferred by the state to the commune of San Sebastian under the Decree of October 31, 1968.

See also 

 List of islands of Spain

References

External links

Google Maps

Islands of Spain
San Sebastián
Landforms of the Basque Country (autonomous community)
Islands of the Bay of Biscay